is a Japanese family name. Throughout the course of the Sengoku period (16th century) of Japan, the famed Takeda clan of Kai Province had many descendant branch families.

Takeda clan (Aki) is a family in the Aki Province 
Takeda clan (Wakasa)
Takeda clan (Kazusa)

People
, Japanese rower
Kumiko Takeda
Larissa Tago Takeda, Japanese voice actress
Masashi Takeda (wrestler), Japanese professional wrestler and mixed martial artist
, Japanese speed skater
Nana Takeda, figure skater
, Japanese sport wrestler
, Japanese swimmer
Shinzaburo Takeda, Mexican artist
, Japanese swimmer
Takeda Sōkaku, reviver of Daitō-ryū aiki-jūjutsu
Takeda-no-miya, one of the former ōke, or cadet branches of the Japanese imperial house established during the Meiji period by a scion of the Fushimi-no-miya. Not related to the samurai family.
Takeda clan, the family of Takeda Shingen, and a relatively important and powerful one therefore, in Japan's Sengoku period
Takeda Nobutora – daimyō, Shingen's father
Takeda Shingen – one of the most famous daimyōs in Japanese history
Takeda Nobushige – Shingen's younger brother, held their father's favour to be heir of the clan, continued to support his older brother throughout his life, he also wrote the Kyūjūkyū Kakun, a set of 99 short rules for Takeda house members
Takeda Nobukado – brother and adviser to Shingen
Takeda Katsuyori – Shingen's son, Katsuyori commanded his father's armies after his death, and saw the fall of the Takeda family
Takeda Yoshinobu – son and initial heir, later executed and succeeded by Katsuyori
, Japanese speed skater
Tsunekazu Takeda, Japanese retired equestrian, former member of the IOC
, Japanese rower
Yūkichi Takeda – scholar of Japanese Literature

Fictional characters
Masashi Takeda, from My-Hime
Takashi Takeda, from Yotsuba&!
Gohee Takeda, from Ginga: Nagareboshi Gin
Takahashi Takeda, from Mortal Kombat
Ittesu Takeda, from Haikyū!!
Hyouma Takeda, from Gantz
Keiichiro "Take" Takeda, from Gender-Swap at the Delinquent Academy
Aimi Takeda, from Gender-Swap at the Delinquent Academy
Ijuro Takeda, a modern Samurai descendant in the movie The Hunted

See also
Takeda (video game)
Takeda Pharmaceutical Company (Takeda; 武田薬品)

References

Japanese-language surnames